Virgin Mountain is a 2015 Icelandic drama film directed by Dagur Kári, starring Gunnar Jónsson and Ilmur Kristjánsdóttir. Its Icelandic title is Fúsi , the name of the lead character. The world premiere took place at the 65th Berlin International Film Festival, where the film was screened on 9 February 2015 in the Berlinale Special program. It was released in Icelandic cinemas on 20 March 2015. The same year, it won the prizes for best narrative feature, actor, and screenplay at the [Tribeca Film Festival]], and the Nordic Council Film Prize.

Plot
An Icelandic man in his 40s lives with his mother and works as ground staff at a nearby airport. He is involved in miniature wargaming in his spare time. On his 42nd birthday Fúsi gets a break from his daily routines when he is enrolled in a dance class. He falls in love but his depressive girlfriend leaves him. He helps his ex-girlfriend to find happiness by turning a dump into a flower boutique shop. Fúsi, at the edge of falling back to his routines, decides to make changes for himself and takes a trip to Egypt and slowly smiles.

Cast
 Gunnar Jónsson as Fúsi
 Ilmur Kristjánsdóttir as Sjöfn
 Sigurjón Kjartansson as Mörður
 Margrét Helga Jóhannsdóttir as Fjóla
 Franziska Una Dagsdóttir as Hera
 Arnar Jónsson as Rolf
 Þórir Sæmundsson as Elvar

Reception
Stephen Dalton wrote in The Hollywood Reporter: "Gunnar Jónsson is an unlikely leading man, but extremely watchable, his physical acting and weary voice conveys both inner torment and purity of heart. Kristjánsdóttir also radiates agreeably offbeat charm as Sjöfn, even if her hangdog angel character that aches for pity would be more at home in a country and western song than in contemporary Iceland. ... A lightweight portrait of a potentially heavy subject, Kári’s fourth feature is an effortlessly likeable addition to his body of work, but too sweet and gentle to leave much of a lasting impression."

References

External links

Virgin Mountain on kinocritics.com

Films about bipolar disorder
2015 drama films
2015 films
Films directed by Dagur Kári
Icelandic drama films
2010s Icelandic-language films